The 2009 CECAFA U-17 Championship was the 2nd edition of the CECAFA U-17 Championship organized bt CECAFA (Council of East and Central Africa Football Association. The second edition of the CEFAFA U-17 Championship, all games were originally to be played in Nairobi, Kenya but have since been moved to Sudan. due to financial reasons, the Sudanese FA and El Merreikh Investment Group have agreed to sponsor the tournament.

The cup is also referred to as the Bashir Cup and the Hassan el Bashir Cup by East African media due to Sudanese President Omar al-Bashir's involvement.

There is a possibility that a third group will be based at Kessala.

Participants

 (invited)
 (invited)

Officials

Group stage

Group A

Group B

Group C

Knockout stage
In the knockout stages, if a match is level at the end of normal playing time, extra time is played (two periods of 15 minutes each) and followed, if necessary, by a penalty shoot-out to determine the winners.

Bracket

Quarter-finals

Semi-finals

Third place play-off

Final

References

CECAFA competitions
2009 in Sudanese sport
2009 in African football